Adjaha is an arrondissement in the Mono department of Benin. It is an administrative division under the jurisdiction of the commune of Grand-Popo. According to the population census conducted by the Institut National de la Statistique Benin on February 15, 2002, the arrondissement had a total population of 5,787.

History 

Adjaha is a town in south Bénin. Adjaha has 8 villages:  Adjaha, Konho, Cotocoli, Kpovidji, Seho-kondi, Todjonukoin, Tokpa-monoto, and Tokpa-Ayizo. Different races are living in Adjaha like Pedah, Fon, Kotafon, and Aïzo. Adjaha is located at the center of Grand-popo region.

References

Populated places in the Mono Department
Arrondissements of Benin